Ágnes Hankiss (born Ágnes Erdős; 7 March 1950 – 17 August 2021) was a Hungarian politician and elected Member of the European Parliament (MEP) with Fidesz, a member of the European People's Party. She was born and died in Budapest, Hungary.

Hankiss is best known in English for her 1992 historical novel A Hungarian Romance: A Novel.

See also
2009 European Parliament election in Hungary

References

1950 births
2021 deaths
Politicians from Budapest
Fidesz MEPs
MEPs for Hungary 2009–2014
Women MEPs for Hungary
Hungarian Jews
20th-century Hungarian politicians
20th-century Hungarian women politicians
21st-century Hungarian politicians